Georgiy Saldadze (born 21 March 1973) is a Ukrainian wrestler. He competed at the 1996 Summer Olympics and the 2000 Summer Olympics. He was affiliated with CSKA Kutaisi and is the brother of Davyd Saldadze.

References

1973 births
Living people
Ukrainian male sport wrestlers
Olympic wrestlers of Ukraine
Wrestlers at the 1996 Summer Olympics
Wrestlers at the 2000 Summer Olympics
Sportspeople from Kutaisi
Ukrainian people of Georgian descent
Armed Forces sports society athletes